The sweet pea, Lathyrus odoratus, is a flowering plant in the genus Lathyrus in the family Fabaceae (legumes), native to Sicily, southern Italy and the Aegean Islands.

The leaves are pinnate with two leaflets and a terminal tendril, which twines around supporting plants and structures, helping the sweet pea to climb. In the wild plant the flowers are purple,  broad; they are larger and highly variable in color in the many cultivars. Flowers are usually strongly scented.

The annual species, L. odoratus, may be confused with the everlasting pea, L. latifolius, a perennial.

Horticultural development
Scottish nurseryman Henry Eckford (1823–1905) cross-bred and developed the sweet pea, turning it from a rather insignificant if sweetly scented flower into a floral sensation of the 19th century.
 
His initial success and recognition came while serving as head gardener for the Earl of Radnor, raising new cultivars of pelargoniums and dahlias. In 1870 he went to work for one Dr. Sankey of Sandywell near Gloucester. A member of the Royal Horticultural Society, he was awarded a First Class Certificate (the top award) in 1882 for introducing the sweet pea cultivar 'Bronze Prince', marking the start of association with the flower. In 1888 he set up his development and trial fields for sweet peas in Wem in Shropshire. By 1901, he had introduced a total of 115 of the 264 cultivars grown at the time. Eckford was presented with the RHS Victoria Medal of Honour for his work. He died in 1906, but his work was continued for a time by his son John Eckford.

More recently, the association between the sweet pea, the Eckfords and Wem has been highlighted again. In the late 1980s, the Sweet Pea Society of Wem started an annual show. Many of the street signs now carry a sweet-pea motif, and an area of the town is known as Eckford Park. There is also a cultivar 'Dorothy Eckford', named after a family member.

Cultivation

Sweet peas have been cultivated since the 17th century and a vast number of cultivars are commercially available. They are grown for their flower colour (usually in pastel shades of blue, pink, purple and white, including bi-colours), and for their intense unique fragrance.  They are grown by gardeners for private enjoyment or for exhibition, and in the floristry trade. The large, pea-shaped seeds are sown in cold frames in Spring or Autumn.  The seeds benefit from pre-soaking or chipping with a sharp blade. The plants are also available later in the season, as young plants or plugs. They are grown up canes, with the new shoots being regularly pinched out to promote a bushy habit and higher flower yields. Plants typically reach heights of 1-2m, with the flowers appearing in midsummer and continuing for many weeks if regularly deadheaded.

Over 50 cultivars have gained the Royal Horticultural Society's Award of Garden Merit.
See List of AGM sweet peas

Pests and diseases
The sweet pea plant does suffer from some pests, the most common being aphids. These insects suck the sap out of the plants, reducing growth. Mosaic virus is spread by greenfly, causing yellowing of leaves, distortion of new shoots, and inhibited flowering.

A pest called the pollen beetle which is small, shiny and black, eats the pollen and disfigures the flowers. Other pests include caterpillars, thrips, slugs and snails. Another problem is mildew; this is a white powdery coating that covers the leaves and slows down growth. When sweet peas are planted too close to each other it causes fungal diseases like powdery mildew. Such fungus suck nutrients from sweet peas and stunt their growth.

The sweet pea is also susceptible to ethylene in quantities produced by senescing plants. Because of this, growers are encouraged to plant sweet peas away from fruit trees among other plants prone to early dieback or senescence.

Toxicity
Unlike the edible pea, there is evidence that seeds of members of the genus Lathyrus are toxic if ingested in quantity. A related species, Lathyrus sativus, is grown for human consumption but when it forms a major part of the diet it causes symptoms of toxicity called lathyrism.

In studies of rats, animals fed a diet of 50% sweet pea seeds developed enlarged adrenals relative to control animals fed on edible peas. The main effect is thought to be on the formation of collagen. Symptoms are similar to those of scurvy and copper deficiency, which share the common feature of inhibiting proper formation of collagen fibrils. Seeds of the sweet pea contain beta-aminopropionitrile that prevents the cross-linking of collagen by inhibiting lysyl oxidase and thus the formation of allysine, leading to loose skin. Recent experiments have attempted to develop this chemical as a treatment to avoid disfiguring skin contractions after skin grafting.

Genetics
Gregor Mendel is today recognized as the "Father of Modern Genetics" for his work with the cross breeding of pea plants (Pisum sativum) with different characteristics, and sweet pea has been used in a similar way. The sweet pea is thus a model organism being used in early experimentations in genetics, particularly by the pioneer geneticist Reginald Punnett. It is highly suitable as a genetic subject because of its ability to self-pollinate and its easily observed Mendelian traits such as colour, height and petal form. Many genetic principles were discovered or confirmed in this species. It was used by Punnett in early studies of genetic linkage. Complementary factor inheritance was also elucidated in sweet peas, from the cross of two pure-breeding white strains which gave rise to a blue hybrid, the blue colour requiring two genes derived independently from the two white parents.

Hybridization with Lathyrus belinensis
Like the blue rose, the yellow sweet pea remains elusive. Lathyrus belinensis is a related Lathyrus species which has red and yellow flowers. There are ongoing attempts to bring the yellow color into Lathyrus odoratus by crossing it with Lathyrus belinensis. Several new sweet pea cultivars have been created as a result, though not any with the yellow flower color so far.

Gallery

See also
 List of AGM sweet peas - list of sweet peas that have gained the Royal Horticultural Society's Award of Garden Merit

References

Lathyrus
Annual plants
Vines
Garden plants
Garden plants of Europe
Plants described in 1753
Nitrogen-fixing crops